Antoni Caimari Caldés (born December 22, 1976) is a self-taught Spanish filmmaker, sculptor, photographer, digital artist, and composer. He is also an author and actor.

Career 
Caldés began making his first kinetic sculptures in 1987 under the influence of the Swiss sculptor Jean Tinguely. His first exhibition was in 1994 where he donated his first large sculpture The Beast to his hometown of La Puebla, located in the public square "Plaza del Mercado" of his town.

Between 1994 and 2009, Caldés held various exhibitions showing his work in different disciplines. He is currently dedicated to the production and realization of his own auteur cinema through the help of notable actors and characters from the world of cinema. He is also the creator of the international film festivals, Palma de Mallorca Films Infest and New York City Films Infest.

Awards 
Antoni's short film, Ma Belle received several awards at different international film festivals, and in August 2022, he received the Iguana de Oro award for his career as a filmmaker and his contribution to culture at the Ecatepec de Morelos Film and Music Festival.

Notable works 
 1994 La Bestia La Puebla (sculpture)
 1997 Hombre Cactus Manacor (sculpture)
 2007 Gallo Buger  (sculpture)

Filmography

As director

Short films  
 2008 – Ensueño
 2009 – Autorretrato
 2010 – Réquiem al amanecer
 2010 – Carrusel
 2010 – La Fábrica de Hielo
 2012 – Memorias de un piano
 2013 – Das Mädchen der Marionette
 2015 – Boucle
 2017 – Ma Belle
 2021 – Velvet

Feature films 
 2013 – El cura y el veneno
 2013 – The Marionette
 2022 – Walk-In

As a producer 
 2008 – Esta noche hay que matar a Franco
 2008 – Retorno

References

External links
 

1976 births
Living people
Spanish composers
Spanish filmmakers
British film producers
Spanish film directors
Spanish sculptors
Spanish photographers